Tartu Health Care College is a higher education institution providing training to healthcare specialists in Estonia. The current rector of Tartu Health Care College is Ulla Preeden.

History
Professor Chr. Fr. Deutsch established a school for midwives in Tartu at 1811. During its 200 years of history, the college has existed under many different names and has provided instruction in several areas of specialization and levels of study. In 2005 the school received the name of Tartu Health Care College.

Curricula
Tartu Health Care College has 9 study programmes  
Higher education programmes
Nursing
Midwifery
Radiography
Physiotherapy
Biomedical Science
Environmental Health
Vocational education programmes
Care Worker
Emergency Medical Technician

References

External links

Universities and colleges in Estonia